Estadio Monumental de Jauja is a multi-use stadium in Jauja, Peru.  It is used by football team Deportivo Wanka.  The stadium holds 10,000 people. 

Monumental de Jauja
Buildings and structures in Junín Region